Collaborative leadership is a management practice which is focused on leadership skills across functional and organizational boundaries.

Term Exploration
The phrase collaborative leadership first appeared in the mid-1990s in response to the twin trends of growth in strategic alliances between private corporations, and the formation of long-term public private partnership contracts to rebuild public infrastructure.

Kurt Lewin was first to apply cooperative system in scientific method in 1947 about individual nutrition in the United States.

In her 1994 Harvard Business Review article "Collaborative Advantage", Rosabeth Moss Kanter addressed leaders who recognize that critical business relationships exist "that cannot be controlled by formal systems but require (a) dense web of interpersonal connections". In their book published that same year, Chrislip and Larson looked at the attributes of great civic leaders in communities across the US and found some similar attributes. "Collaboration needs a different kind of leadership; it needs leaders who can safeguard the process, facilitate interaction and patiently deal with high levels of frustration"  

In 2013, Harvard Business Review authors Nick Lovegrove and Matthew Thomas (co-founders of The InterSector Project), explore the complex relationship between the business, government and social sectors as it relates to said sectors role in addressing society's most pressing challenges; issues such as managing resource constraints, controlling health care costs, training the twenty-first-century workforce, developing and implementing smart-grid and intelligent-urbanization technologies, and stabilizing financial systems to foster sustainable economic growth.  Their research suggests that the future of collaborative leadership depends on the ability of leaders to engage and collaborate with the business, government and social sectors (see below for the distinguishing characteristics of such leaders).

Hank Rubin author and founder of the Institute for Collaborative Leadership has written "A collaboration is a purposeful relationship in which all parties strategically choose to cooperate in order to accomplish a shared outcome." In his book Collaborative Leadership: Developing Effective Partnerships for Communities and Schools, Rubin asks "Who is a collaborative leader?" and answers "You are a collaborative leader once you have accepted responsibility for building - or helping to ensure the success of - a heterogeneous team to accomplish a shared purpose . Your tools are (1) the purposeful exercise of your behavior, communication, and organizational resources in order to affect the perspective, beliefs, and behaviors of another person (generally a collaborative partner) to influence that person's relationship with you and your collaborative enterprise and (2) the structure and climate of an environment that supports the collaborative relationship."

Rubin and Brock distinguish collaborative leadership from collective impact, defining the latter as "...(beginning) when we, as a community, agree to a set of shared outcomes and then, individually, return to our home organizations and work with our staffs, boards, and volunteers to figure out what we - individually and organizationally - can best do to achieve those shared goals." Collaborative leadership is how we align and integrate across organizations.

David Archer and Alex Cameron, in their 2008 book Collaborative Leadership: How to succeed in an interconnected world, identify the basic objective of the collaborative leader as the delivery of results across boundaries between different organisations. They say "Getting value from difference is at the heart of the collaborative leader's task... they have to learn to share control, and to trust a partner to deliver, even though that partner may operate very differently from themselves."

Providing further exploration, in his 2015 book Enabling Collaboration – Achieving Success Through Strategic Alliances and Partnerships , Martin Echavarria argues that Collaborative Leadership is  the result of individual collaborative leadership capability, as well as group leadership. In this respect, he argues that individuals can support and contribute to collaboration and do so from a leadership point of view; but at the group level, where collaboration can be behaviorally experienced. Echavarria cites the work of Enrique Pichon-Rivière, who developed the Operative Group method for working with groups, Wilfred Bion an influential British psychoanalyst, Kurt Lewin and others and describes the Operative Partnership Methodology for coaching teams to collaborate (an issue which is addressed vis-a-vis strategic alliances in said publication.

Characteristics of collaborative leaders
There have been a number of research projects and reviews of key lessons learned for collaborative leaders.

Nick Lovegrove and Matthew Thomas, writing for the Harvard Business Review, interviewed over 100 leaders who possess a demonstrated ability to engage and collaborate across the business, government and social sectors.  The authors identified six major, distinguishing characteristics:

 Balanced motivations. A desire to create public value no matter where they work, combining their motivations to wield influence (often in government), have social impact (often in nonprofits) and generate wealth (often in business)
 Transferable skills. A set of distinctive skills valued across sectors, such as quantitative analytics, strategic planning and stakeholder management
 Contextual intelligence. A deep empathy of the differences within and between sectors, especially those of language, culture and key performance indicators
 Integrated networks. A set of relationships across sectors to draw on when advancing their careers, building top teams, or convening decision-makers on a particular issue
 Prepared mind. A willingness to pursue an unconventional career that zigzags across sectors, and the financial readiness to take potential pay cuts from time to time
 Intellectual thread. Holistic subject matter expertise on a particular intersector issue by understanding it from the perspective of each sector

Madeline Carter, writing for the Center for Effective Public Policy as part of a research project funded by the United States Department of Justice and State Justice Institute, defines five qualities of a collaborative leader:

 Willingness to take risks
 Eager listeners
 Passion for the cause
 Optimistic about the future
 Able to share knowledge, power and credit

Archer and Cameron list ten key lessons for successful collaborative leaders:

Find the personal motive for collaborating
Find ways of simplifying complex situations for your people
Prepare for how you are going to handle conflict well in advance
Recognize that there are some people or organisations you just can't partner with
Have the courage to act for the long term
Actively manage the tension between focusing on delivery and on building relationships
Invest in strong personal relationships at all levels
Inject energy, passion and drive into your leadership style
Have the confidence to share the credit generously
Continually develop your interpersonal skills, in particular: empathy, patience, tenacity, holding difficult conversations, and coalition building.

Rod Newing writing in a Financial Times supplement special report says "If a collaboration is to be effective, each party must recognise and respect the different culture of the other". And traditional development paths don't prepare leaders well for this "traditional management development, is based on giving potential managers a team of people and a set of resources to control – and success is rewarded with more people and more resources to control. By contrast, collaboration requires managers to achieve success through people and resources outside their control and for this they have had no preparation".

Steven Wilson mentions in “Collaborative leadership: it’s good to talk,” four major key leadership traits that all highly collaborative leaders share:
 Focus on authentic leadership; placing the goals of the organization ahead of their own self-interest and following through on their commitments
 Relentlessly pursue transparent decision making; clear how their decisions are made and who is accountable for the outcomes
 View resources as instruments of action; realizing shared goals through the flexible use of shared resources
 Clarify the relationship between decisions, rights, accountability and rewards; taking time to establish decision paths and a common vocabulary that everyone can comprehend for successful collaborations
Chantale Mailhot, Stephanie Gagnon, Anne Langley and Louis-Felix Binitte did a research project to examine the qualities of distributing leadership and the effects diversity has on groups. They found that "coupling of leaders and objects helped to maintain the worldview of the different groups involved at different levels in the research project, while directing them towards project objectives". In retrospect, the differences of each individual increases innovation due to the variety of minds at work. With everyone having their own qualities and prior experiences, the integration between them in a leadership role contributes to the overall experience. In this study, the case was made that collaborative leadership has many benefits and is more practical than just one person solely having the role as the leader.

The best thing a collaborative leader can do is to lead by example. They have to ‘walk the talk’, and be seen to model the right behaviors. Leaders must show a willingness take risks, continually question their own ideas, and reward others for their clear communication and valuable insights.

Applications
The need for collaborative leadership is being recognised in more and more areas;
Public Private Partnerships
Global Supply Chains
Civic collaboration to solve complex community problems
On-line collaboration – Linux, Wikipedia etc.
Political collaboration to tackle global issues such as the credit crunch, climate change and terrorism
The Government-  According to Heather Getha-Taylor and Ricardo S. Morse as part of their article, collaborative leadership has an impact on the roles of local government officials. It is said that public administration is shifting to a more collaborative leadership oriented field, because it helps with the set of skills necessary for the jobs.
Education- According to Abdolhamid Arbabi and Vali Mehdinezhad collaborative leadership adds to cooperation which allows for adaptability and consistency. It “increases organizational commitment and decreases employee resistance to changes.” There is a significant correlation between the teachers self-efficiency and the principles style of collaborative leadership. According to Gialamas, Pelonis, and Medeiros collaborative leadership allows for leaders to work together. It allows for a better adaptability to change which in turn allows for “growth and development.”
Health Services- According to Markle-Reid, Dykeman, Ploeg, Stradiotto, Andrews, Bonomo, & Stradiotto, collaborative leadership in the Health area will allow for a more widespread set of skills required to help the patients. An example brought up is the idea that the elderly do not receive the help they require because the people do not know how to react in the given case. They know what to do, but when confronted by the situation they do not know how to act. Collaborative leadership will allow for the skills necessary as well as a uniform set of actions they must follow.
An Ipsos MORI research report published in 2007 found that relationship management and collaborative leadership were the top two qualities or capabilities that Directors of organisations involved in large business partnerships would have liked to have had more access to when setting up or running a partnership.

See also
Business partnering
Collaboration
Shared leadership
Situational leadership
Strategic alliance
Wikinomics
Orpheus Chamber Orchestra

References

Further reading

Business terms
Leadership studies
Collaboration